Andrzeja Górska (born Maria Stefania Górska; 2 February 1917 – 15 December 2007) was a Polish Roman Catholic nun.

She was born in Łódź, the sixth of nine children. Gorska served as the abbess, or Mother Superior, of the Congregation of the Ursulines of the Agonizing Heart of Jesus, who are more commonly known as the Grey Ursulines. She was involved in the protection of Jewish children during the German occupation in World War II

Gorska died on 15 December 2007 in Warsaw. She was 93 years old.

Awards
Medal of the Righteous Among the Nations 
Commander's Cross of the Polonia Restituta (2007)

References

External links

Andrzeja Górska obituary 
Andrzeja Górska – her activity to save Jews' lives during the Holocaust, at Yad Vashem website

1917 births
2007 deaths
Commanders of the Order of Polonia Restituta
Polish Righteous Among the Nations
20th-century Polish Roman Catholic nuns
People from Łódź
21st-century Polish Roman Catholic nuns